Bushy Hare is a 1950 Warner Bros. Looney Tunes cartoon directed by Robert McKimson. The short was released on November 18, 1950, and stars Bugs Bunny.

Bugs winds up in the Australian Outback, where he is switched with a baby kangaroo and has to deal with an aborigine hunter. The title is a play on "bushy hair" along with aborigines stereotypically being from "the bush" country.

The baby kangaroo is played by Hippety Hopper, in a cameo appearance. This is the only cartoon in which Hippety Hopper is not paired with Sylvester the Cat, and the only one in which the character speaks (with one line at the end); like Bugs, Hippety is voiced by Mel Blanc.

Plot
Bugs pops out in Golden Gate Park and encounters a man, who asks Bugs to hold his balloons while he ties his shoelaces. Bugs complies, but soon finds himself lifted in the air by the balloons and drifting off into the ocean. Eventually he clashes in midair with a stork delivering a kangaroo joey, leading to Bugs getting switched with the joey, brought to Australia, and dropped into a kangaroo's arms. Bugs refuses to be the kangaroo's baby, but feels guilty after the kangaroo starts crying and agrees to be its 'baby'.

After a wild ride inside the kangaroo's pouch, Bugs gets out and is then struck by a boomerang thrown by an aborigine, whom Bugs later calls "Nature Boy". Bugs throws the boomerang away but it hits him again. Nature Boy confronts Bugs, who teases him into a yelling fit. Nature Boy throws his spear at Bugs, who runs and dives into a rabbit hole. Bugs tricks Nature Boy into thinking he's stabbing the rabbit down the hole, then kicks the man down into the hole.

Later Nature Boy spies Bugs walking and attempts to shoot a poisonous fruit at him, but Bugs blows through his bamboo blowgun, causing the man to ingest the fruit instead. Nature Boy then chases Bugs, who gets into the front of a canoe and rows off. He soon realizes Nature Boy is in the back of the same canoe and then they row into a tunnel. A moment later they come out another tunnel in each other's arms. The tunnel has a sign identifying it as a "Tunnel of Love" like from an old amusement park or carnival. Bugs says, "Gosh, Nature, I didn't know you cared." Nature Boy flies into a rage and chases Bugs up a cliff where the two of them fight in the kangaroo's pouch. Finally, Bugs kicks Nature Boy out and the kangaroo kicks him off of the cliff. Then, the joey floats down from the sky into his mother's pouch. The kangaroo gives Bugs a ride back to the US, using an outboard motor to power the kangaroo across the sea.

Reception
The Film Daily called the short a "wonderful cartoon for all ages" on July 22, 1950. On November 18, 1950 Boxoffice said, "This is a wealth of imagination and is really funny."

Home media
"Bushy Hare" was released on the single-disc Bugs Bunny: Hare Extraordinaire DVD released in August 2010.

References

External links

 
 

1950 films
1950 short films
1950 comedy films
1950 animated films
1950s English-language films
1950s Warner Bros. animated short films
American animated short films
Looney Tunes shorts
Bugs Bunny films
Animated films about kangaroos and wallabies
Films about Aboriginal Australians
Animated films about friendship
Films set in the Outback
Animated films set in San Francisco
Films set in 1950
Films directed by Robert McKimson
Films scored by Carl Stalling
Warner Bros. Cartoons animated short films
Hippety Hopper films